Endothelial PAS domain-containing protein 1 (EPAS1, also known as hypoxia-inducible factor-2alpha (HIF-2α)) is a protein that is encoded by the EPAS1 gene in mammals. It is a type of hypoxia-inducible factor, a group of transcription factors involved in the physiological response to oxygen concentration. The gene is active under hypoxic conditions. It is also important in the development of the heart, and for maintaining the catecholamine balance required for protection of the heart. Mutation often leads to neuroendocrine tumors.

However, several characterized alleles of EPAS1 contribute to high-altitude adaptation in humans. One such allele, which has been inherited from Denisovan archaic hominins, is known to confer increased athletic performance in some people, and has therefore been referred to as the "super athlete gene".

Function 

The EPAS1 gene encodes one subunit of a transcription factor involved in the induction of genes regulated by oxygen, and which is induced as oxygen concentration falls (hypoxia). The protein contains a basic helix-loop-helix protein dimerization domain as well as a domain found in signal transduction proteins which respond to oxygen levels. EPAS1 is involved in the development of the embryonic heart and is expressed in endothelial cells that line the walls of blood vessels in the umbilical cord. 

EPAS1 is also essential for the maintenance of catecholamine homeostasis and protection against heart failure during early embryonic development. Catecholamines regulated by EPAS1 include epinephrine and norepinephrine. It is critical that the production of catecholamines remain in homeostatic conditions so that both the delicate fetal heart and the adult heart do not overexert themselves and induce heart failure. Catecholamine production in the embryo is related to control of cardiac output by increasing the fetal heart rate.

Alleles 

A high percentage of Tibetans carry an allele of EPAS1 that improves oxygen transport. The beneficial allele is also found in the extinct Denisovan genome, suggesting that it arose in them and entered the modern human population through hybridization.

The Himalayan wolf and the Tibetan mastiff have inherited an altitude-adaptive allele of the gene from interbreeding with a ghost population of an unknown wolf-like canid. The EPAS1 allele is known to confer an adaptive advantage to animals living at high altitudes.

Clinical significance 

Mutations in the EPAS1 gene are related to early-onset neuroendocrine tumors such as paragangliomas, somatostatinomas and/or pheochromocytomas. The mutations are commonly somatic missense mutations that locate in the primary hydroxylation site of HIF-2α, which disrupt the protein hydroxylation/degradation mechanism, and leads to protein stabilization and pseudohypoxic signaling. In addition, these neuroendocrine tumors release erythropoietin (EPO) into circulating blood, and lead to polycythemia.

Mutations in this gene are associated with erythrocytosis familial type 4, pulmonary hypertension, and chronic mountain sickness. There is also evidence that certain variants of this gene provide protection for people living at high altitude such as in Tibet. The effect is most profound among the Tibetans living in the Himalayas at an altitude of about 4,000 metres above sea level, the environment of which is intolerable to other human populations due to 40% less atmospheric oxygen. 

A study by UC Berkeley identified more than 30 genetic factors that make Tibetans' bodies well-suited for high-altitudes, including EPAS1. 
 Tibetans suffer no health problems associated with altitude sickness, but instead produce low levels of blood pigment (haemoglobin) sufficient for less oxygen, more elaborate blood vessels, have lower infant mortality, and are heavier at birth. 

EPAS1 is useful in high altitudes as a short term adaptive response. However, EPAS1 can also cause excessive production of red blood cells leading to chronic mountain sickness that can lead to death and inhibited reproductive abilities. Some mutations that increase its expression are associated with increased hypertension and stroke at low altitude, with symptoms similar to mountain sickness. Populations living permanently at high altitudes experience selection on EPAS1 for mutations which reduce the negative fitness consequences of excessive red blood cell production.

Interactions 

EPAS1 has been shown to interact with aryl hydrocarbon receptor nuclear translocator and ARNTL.

References

Further reading

External links 
 

Transcription factors
PAS-domain-containing proteins